Kaplon may refer to:

 Kaplon (chieftain), a Hungarian tribal chieftain
 Kaplon (genus), a gens (clan) in the Kingdom of Hungary

See also
 Kaplin (disambiguation)
 Kapton, a polyimide film